Given an exterior differential system defined on a manifold M, the Cartan–Kuranishi prolongation theorem says that after a finite number of prolongations the system is either in involution (admits at least one 'large' integral manifold), or is impossible.

History
The theorem is named after Élie Cartan and Masatake Kuranishi.

Applications
This theorem is used in infinite-dimensional Lie theory.

See also
Cartan-Kähler theorem

References
 M. Kuranishi, On É. Cartan's prolongation theorem of exterior differential systems, Amer. J. Math., vol. 79, 1957, p. 1–47

Partial differential equations
Theorems in analysis